Ethacizine (ethacyzine) is a class Ic antiarrhythmic agent, related to moracizine. It is used in Russia and some other CIS countries for the treatment of severe and/or refractory ventricular and supraventricular arrhythmias, especially those accompanied by organic heart disease. It is also indicated as a treatment of refractory tachycardia associated with Wolff–Parkinson–White syndrome.

It is manufactured under the brand name Ethacizin (Этацизин) by Latvian pharmaceutical company Olainfarm.

Synthesis
For the treatment of heart infarction:

The amide formation between Phenothiazine-2-ethylcarbamate [37711-29-8] (1) and 3-Chloropropionyl chloride [625-36-5] (2) gives ethyl N-[10-(3-chloropropanoyl)phenothiazin-2-yl]carbamate [119407-03-3] [34749-22-9] (3). Displacement of the remaining ω-halogen by diethylamine (4) then completes the synthesis of ethacizine (5).

References

Antiarrhythmic agents
Carbamates
Sodium channel blockers
Phenothiazines
Diethylamino compounds
Drugs in the Soviet Union